Keiga, Yega, or Deiga is a Kadu language spoken in Kordofan. Dialects are Demik (Rofik) and Keiga proper (Aigang).

Keiga is a VSO language. Reh (1994) instead uses the name Deiga or Dayga, with a prefix d- instead of the place prefix k-.

Demographics
Stevenson (1956; 1957) originally called the language Keiga, after the places where it is mainly spoken, namely Keiga Timmero, Keiga al-Kheil and Keiga Lubun. The local name for the language is sani m-aigaŋ 'speech of Keiga' (Stevenson 1956: 104). Stevenson (1956: 104) considers it to be a language cluster consisting of two dialects, Keiga proper and Demik, with a total number of approximately 7,520 speakers (with 1,504 taxpayers).

Villages
Keiga is spoken in the following villages according to the 22nd edition of Ethnologue:
Ambong (Àmbóŋ) area: Ambong, Ambongadi, Arungekkaadi, Bila Ndulang, Kandang, Kuluwaring, Lakkadi, Roofik, Saadhing, Taffor, and Tingiragadi villages
Lubung (Lùbúŋ) area: Kuwaik, Miya Ndumuru, Miya Ntaarang, Miya Ntaluwa, Semalili, and Tungunungunu villages
Tumuro (Tʊ̀mʊ̀rɔ̀) area: Jughuba, Kayide, Koolo, and Tumuro villages

Blench (2005) identified 3 dialects, which are Àmbóŋ, Lùbúŋ, and Tʊ̀mʊ̀rɔ̀.

Àmbóŋ villages are as follows. Only Taffor, Kantang, Lak ka aati, and Arungek ka aati villages were reported by Blench (2005) to be inhabited. The rest were abandoned due to the Sudanese Civil War.

Lùbúŋ villages are as follows. Only Küwëk is inhabited.

Tʊ̀mʊ̀rɔ̀ villages are as follows. Only Koolo is inhabited.

References

External links 
Keiga basic lexicon at the Global Lexicostatistical Database

Languages of Sudan
Kadu languages
Severely endangered languages